Bahram Muzaffer (born August 4, 1986 in Fergana, Uzbekistan) is a Turkish  amateur boxer competing in the light-heavyweight division.

Biography 

Bahram Muzaffer was born in Uzbekistan to a family of Turkish Meskhetian descent. Three years later his family fled the country in the midst of Turkish pogroms first to Russia, then to Azerbaijan, until they finally settled in Turkey in 1996. Muzaffer qualified for the 2008 Olympics at light-heavyweight after he was re-allocated the position vacated by Ismayl Sillakh. At the Olympics, Muzaffer beat Aziz Ali but lost in the round of 16 to Ireland's runner-up Kenneth Egan by 2:10.

He moved up a division and lost a surprisingly close fight at the 2009 World Amateur Boxing Championships – Heavyweight to eventual winner Egor Mekhontsev 5:7. He won the bronze medal at the 2011 European Amateur Championships held in Ankara, Turkey losing to Tervel Pulev.

Later he went back down to win the Olympic qualifier at Light Heavyweight. At the 2012 Olympics he lost his first fight to Ehsan Rouzbahani.
The Iranian edged past the first round 5-4 and the Turkish boxer clinched the second round with a similar result. In the final round, Rouzbahani gained the upper hand and upped his work rate and Muzaffer could not cope with the sudden injection of pace.

Achievements 
2006
 World University Championship in Almaty, Kazakhstan - 
 European Union Amateur Championships on May 23–27 in Pécs, Hungary - 

2007
 European Union Amateur Championships on June 18–23 in Dublin, Ireland - 

2008
 World University Championship in Kazan, Russia - 

2010
 World University Championship in Ulan Bator, Mongolia - 

2011
 European Amateur Championships on June 17–24 in Ankara, Turkey -

References

External links
Qualifier
Olympic results

1986 births
People from Fergana
Living people
Light-heavyweight boxers
Heavyweight boxers
Boxers at the 2008 Summer Olympics
Olympic boxers of Turkey
Turkish people of Uzbekistani descent
Meskhetian Turkish people
Naturalized citizens of Turkey
Uzbekistani emigrants to Turkey
Boxers at the 2012 Summer Olympics
Turkish male boxers
European champions for Turkey
Boxers at the 2015 European Games
European Games competitors for Turkey